Haydentown is an unincorporated village located along Route 857 in Fayette County, Pennsylvania, United States.

History 
John Hayden came to Fayette County, Pennsylvania in 1778, after serving for 6 months in the Revolutionary War. Being a blacksmith by trade, he soon discovered stone coal (hard coal) and the best of iron ore. There were a few Scotch settled just west of the trading post called Hardbargain and this settlement became known as Georgetown. About the same time some Germans organized the settlement of Berlin. Georgetown became known as Haydenberg and was patented by John Hayden in 1787; the town soon became known as Haydentown.

About the year 1789, John dug out what he supposed was limestone from a creek bed of a tributary of the Georges River in Georges Township. He attempted to burn the limestone but found it would not burn. Taking some of it to the blacksmith shop, he discovered it was iron ore of the best quality. In 1910, more iron ore was made in Haydentown than in the city of Pittsburgh.

John was a captain of a company of militia raised in the three settlements of Berlin, Georgetown and Hardbargain. They drove the hostile Indians north and west. For his service he was allotted 9,000 acres of land. An act was never passed by Congress giving the right to dispose of this land and all records were destroyed in the War of 1812, only the part John donated for the Hayden Cemetery was honored. The cemetery is now known as the White Rock Cemetery.

References

Unincorporated communities in Pennsylvania
Unincorporated communities in Fayette County, Pennsylvania